Dereźnia may refer to the following places in Poland:

Dereźnia Majdańska
Dereźnia Solska
Dereźnia-Zagrody